Big John Hamilton may refer to:

 Big John Hamilton (actor) (1916–1984), American actor
 Big John Hamilton (vocalist), American vocalist